Orford Priory was a priory of Premonstratensian canonesses in Stainton le Vale, Lincolnshire, England.

The priory of Orford, in Stainton-le-Vale, was probably built some time during the reign of King Henry II by Ralf d'Albini, in honour of the Virgin Mary.

In the Middle Ages, Lincolnshire was one of the most densely populated parts of England. Within the historical county there were no less than nine  Premonstratensian houses. Other than Orford Priory, these were:  Barlings Abbey, Cammeringham Priory, Hagnaby Abbey, Newbo Abbey, Newsham Abbey, Stixwould Priory, Tupholme Abbey and  West Ravendale Priory.

A nun from Orford was excommunicated in 1491 by Bishop Redman for breach of her vow of chastity, her partner being a canon of Newsham.

There were seven nuns and a prioress when the priory was Dissolved in 1539.

The remains of the priory, and Post-medieval house and garden lie immediately south of the now derelict Priory farm.

References

Monasteries in Lincolnshire
Premonstratensian monasteries in England